Carlos Alberto Cáceda Ollaguez (born 27 September 1991) is a Peruvian footballer who plays as a goalkeeper for Melgar. Cáceda is known as a secured goal-stopper with quick reflexes and a speedy pace to rush off his line. He played all games when Universitario under-20 squad won the 2011 U-20 Copa Libertadores.

Club career
Cáceda began his senior career with Alianza Atlético in 2008. He was given his Torneo Descentralizado league debut by manager Teddy Cardama in Round 14 (Apertura). Cáceda entered the match for the sent-off Jorge Rivera in 22nd minute but could not help his side avoid the 1–4 defeat at home to Coronel Bolognesi. The match was his only league appearance with the Sullana club.

Then, in January 2011, Cáceda joined Universitario de Deportes' first team. However, in his first season he mainly played in the reserves. Cáceda also featured for the Universitario U20 side that won the 2011 U-20 Copa Libertadores. He played in all the matches including the final against Boca Juniors. Later that year he made his league debut for the senior team on 5 November playing from the start in the 0–0 draw at home against Inti Gas Deportes.

International career
Cáceda represented the Peru U-20 squad at the 2011 South American U-20 Championship.

In November 2012, Cáceda received his first call to join the Peruvian national team led by then manager Sergio Markarián. At the time, however, he did not participate in the friendly match against Honduras. His first appearance was on 28 May 2016 in a friendly game against El Salvador, in which Peru won 3–1. In May 2018, he was named in Peru's provisional 24 man squad for the 2018 World Cup in Russia. Cáceda was also part of Peru's squad at the 2019 Copa América in Brazil, in which Peru was the runner-up.

In June 2019, he was included by Nolberto Solano in Peru U-23's squad for the 2019 Pan American Games. At that time, Cáceda was 27, but each team was allowed to include a maximum of three overage players in their roster.

Career statistics

Club

International
Statistics accurate as of Peru's match played on 23 June 2021.

Honours

Club
Universitario de Deportes
 Torneo Apertura: 2016
 Torneo Descentralizado: 2013
 U-20 Copa Libertadores: 2011

International
Peru
 Copa América Runner-up: 2019

Individual
 Peruvian First Division Goalkeeper of the Year: 2016
 Peruvian First Division Team of the Year: 2016

References

External links

1991 births
Living people
Footballers from Lima
Peruvian footballers
Alianza Atlético footballers
Club Universitario de Deportes footballers
C.D. Veracruz footballers
Deportivo Municipal footballers
FBC Melgar footballers
Peruvian Primera División players
Association football goalkeepers
Peru international footballers
Copa América Centenario players
2018 FIFA World Cup players
2019 Copa América players
2021 Copa América players